Her Only Child is a television film which premiered on March 22, 2008 in the United States.

Plot
Lily Stanler (Nicholle Tom) works as a claims analyst for an insurance company in Philadelphia. She is an average woman living an average life. Unfortunately, her life gets interrupted by her mother, Inez (Gwynyth Walsh). Lily moved in with her mother to take care of her when she was ill. This creates more responsibilities for Lily. In the past, Inez's husband has left her, making her a lonely and bitter person. As time goes by, she becomes even lonelier and possessive, wanting her daughter to be home all the time.

At work, Lily meets Larry Nowack (Cameron Daddo), who works in another department of the company. The two get to know each other better, by going out to lunch at the local Chinese restaurant and eating dinner at Larry's house. An instant romance is developed, although Lily's mother is not thrilled about this situation. To prevent her daughter from seeing Larry, Inez tries to foul up her relationship. For instance, several times she has called up Lily to come home immediately, because she "accidentally" cut herself or the dog mistakenly ate chocolate (even though Inez purposely cut herself and fed the dog chocolate). Lily soon realizes that her mother is only behaving this way to prevent her from being with Larry.

External links

2008 drama films
2008 television films
2008 films
Canadian drama television films
English-language Canadian films
Films set in Philadelphia
Lifetime (TV network) films
Films shot in Ottawa
Films directed by Douglas Jackson
2000s Canadian films